Nesselwängle is a municipality in the district of Reutte in the Austrian state of Tyrol.

Geography
Nesselwängle lies at the entrance to the Tannheim Valley.

References

External links 
 Official website 
 Website of the skiing area Nesselwängle 

Cities and towns in Reutte District